Air Central (IATA: GI, ICAO: LHA) is a cargo airline,It was formerly known as China Central Longhao Airlines (China Central Longhao Airlines was formerly known as Guangdong Longhao Airlines) , established in August 2015 with registered capital of 400 million yuan. It was acquired by Henan Civil Aviation Development & Investment Group in June 2019

History 
In August 2015, Guangdong Longhao Aviation Co., Ltd., a wholly owned subsidiary, was registered with a registered capital of RMB400 million. Company to Guangzhou Baiyun International Airport as the main operating base.

On June 8, 2016, CAAC formally approved the preparation for the establishment of Guangdong Longhao Aviation Co., Ltd.

In November 2016, the company obtained a business license.

In December 2016, the company's first Boeing 737-300F aircraft completed modification and successful flight test.

In February 2017, the company successfully passed the certification demonstration of on-site certification.

March 2017, CCAR121 awarded the Ministry of operation certificate.

On March 29, 2017, Long Hao Airlines successfully achieved the maiden voyage between Guangzhou Baiyun International Airport and Nantong Xing Dong International Airport.

As of October 2017, 9 freight routes have been opened.

In June 2019, Henan Civil Aviation Development & Investment Group acquired Guangdong Longhao Airlines and changed its name to China Central Longhao Airlines

The company was later renamed Air central

Destinations 
Guangzhou–Guangzhou Baiyun International Airport

Hangzhou–Hangzhou Xiaoshan International Airport

Xi'an–Xi'an Xianyang International Airport

Nantong–Nantong Xingdong Airport

Wuxi and Suzhou–Sunan Shuofang International Airport

Nanjing–Nanjing Lukou International Airport

Shenzhen–Shenzhen Bao'an International Airport

Quanzhou–Quanzhou Jinjiang Airport

Linyi–Linyi Airport

Fleet 

As of May 2021 the China Central Longhao Airlines fleet consisted of:

Main business and future planning 
The company initially set up Boeing B737 series models of air passenger and cargo fleet, operating domestic and international air passenger and cargo operations, including international and domestic (including Hong Kong, Macao and Taiwan) air cargo shipping business: aircraft maintenance, aircraft supply, the airport waiting Airport management services, air transport goods packaging services, handling handling, road transport of goods agents, international freight forwarders, cargo inspection agency services.

Currently, Long Hao Airways has purchased three Boeing 737-300F aircraft. In the future, the Company will make full use of the advantageous resources of the Guangzhou International Hub Airport and gradually expand the fleet size. It is estimated that the number of aircraft fleet will increase by 5 each year and reach about 50 by 2020, And built an air transport network system based in Guangzhou and taking B777 / A350 series aircraft as its carrying capacity to radiate Southeast Asia and even the world.

References

External links 
 Guangdong Long Hao Aviation Group Co., Ltd.

Airlines of China
Airlines established in 2015
Companies based in Guangzhou
Chinese companies established in 2015

Cargo airlines of China